Catherine Debrunner (born 11 April 1995) is a Swiss athlete and teacher. She has competed for Team Switzerland at the 2019 World Para Athletics Championships where she won a gold and silver medal.

Early life
Debrunner was born on 11 April 1995 in Mettendorf, Switzerland. Due to a birth defect in her spine, she uses a wheelchair. While attending a sports camp in Nottwil, she met her future trainer and coach Paul Odermatt.

Career
Debrunner competed in the T53 200 metres at the 2015 IPC Athletics World Championships, where she earned a silver medal with a time of 30.64. She qualified for the 2016 Summer Paralympics in Rio, where she finished seventh in the Women's 400 metres.

Debrunner subsequently took a break from sports to focus on her education before returning to Team Switzerland for the 2019 World Para Athletics Championships. In Dubai, she earned a gold medal in the Women's 400m T53 and a silver medal in the women's 800m T53 race.

At the 2022 Berlin Marathon, Debrunner, competing in her first marathon won the race with a time of 1:36:47, beating five-time winner Manuela Schär's streak of five Berlin Marathon wins.

References

Living people
1995 births
Swiss female wheelchair racers
Athletes (track and field) at the 2016 Summer Paralympics
Paralympic athletes of Switzerland
People from Bitburg-Prüm
World Para Athletics Championships winners
Medalists at the World Para Athletics European Championships
Athletes (track and field) at the 2020 Summer Paralympics
20th-century Swiss women
21st-century Swiss women